Hajazi (also Romanized as Ḩajāzī; also known as Ḩasanjaḥāzī) is a village in Hur Rural District, in the Central District of Faryab County, Kerman Province, Iran. At the 2006 census, its population was 200, in 43 families.

References 

Populated places in Faryab County